Polygala virgata is a species of flowering plant in the milkwort family (Polygalaceae). It is native to South Africa and Botswana.

References

virgata
Flora of South Africa
Flora of Botswana